Nostru may refer to :

Graiul Nostru was a monthly literary magazine published in Bârlad, Romania by the Academia Bârlădeană. 
Scrisul Nostru was a monthly literary magazine published in Bârlad, Romania by the Academia Bârlădeană.